Eetu Muinonen (born 5 April 1986) is a Finnish footballer, who plays for RoPS.

Career
He has played in the Finnish premier division of football, Veikkausliiga, representing MyPa of Anjalankoski. On 1 January 2009 he joined Belgian club S.V. Zulte Waregem, together with teammate Tarmo Neemelo.

International
He was also a member of Finland national under-21 football team.

References

External links
Muinonen, Neemelo & Hyland signs at Waregem

1986 births
Living people
People from Mikkeli
Finnish footballers
Finnish expatriate footballers
Myllykosken Pallo −47 players
Rovaniemen Palloseura players
FC Haka players
Veikkausliiga players
S.V. Zulte Waregem players
Expatriate footballers in Belgium
Finnish expatriate sportspeople in Belgium
Expatriate footballers in Iceland
Belgian Pro League players
Kotkan Työväen Palloilijat players
Association football midfielders
Mikkelin Kissat players
Sportspeople from South Savo